Rajlokkhi Complex is a shopping mall situated in Uttara, Dhaka. It is the oldest shopping mall in Uttara. This shopping mall is closed on Wednesday and half of Thursday.

Location
Rajlokkhi complex is situated in Sector 3 of Uttara Model Town. Anyone can gain access to the shopping mall from Dhaka–Mymensingh highway. There is a bus stop in the same name.

History
Bangladeshi actor Razzak started to building this shopping mall in 1986. It was originally constructing as a three-storey building which was completed after six years as a six-storey building funded by Sonali Bank. Although Razzak wanted to have a cinema hall in the building, he and his family were unable to build it due to government objections.

Description
Rajlokkhi Complex is a 12,960 sq ft shopping mall. In addition to many shops and offices, there are some shop selling various products needed for the kitchen. 'Daily Shopping' retail chain has a store in Rajlokkhi Complex.

Events
 On November 22, 2016, the Rajlaxmi Complex caught fire, causing minor damage.
 On February 27, 2019, thousands of people marched in the shopping mall area demanding justice for the murder of a child.

Notes

References

Uttara
Shopping malls in Dhaka
Shopping malls established in 1992